Ayman Ben Hassine (born 8 November 1980) is a Tunisian cyclist.

Palmares

2000
2nd National Road Race Championships
2004
1st  National Road Race Championships
1st Stage 1 Tour d'Egypte
2005
1st  National Road Race Championships
1st Stage 4 Tour d'Egypte
2006
1st Stage 6 Tour des Aéroports
1st Stage 2 Tour du Maroc
2nd National Road Race Championships
2007
1st  National Road Race Championships
1st  National Time Trial Championships
1st Stage 5 Tour d'Egypte
1st Stage 6 Tour of Libya
2008
1st  National Time Trial Championships
1st Stages 1 & 8 Tour de la Pharmacie Centrale
1st International Grand Prix Messaeed
1st International Grand Prix Doha
1st Stage 2 Cycling Golden Jersey
2nd Overall Tour d'Egypte
1st Stages 3 & 4
2009
1st HH Vice-President's Cup
1st Emirates Cup

References

1980 births
Living people
Tunisian male cyclists
21st-century Tunisian people